Lipník is a municipality and village in Třebíč District in the Vysočina Region of the Czech Republic. It has about 400 inhabitants.

Notable people
Josef Hlouch (1902–1972), Roman Catholic prelate and theologian

References

Villages in Třebíč District